Max Friedrich Koch (24 November 1859, Berlin – 18 February 1930, Sacrow, Potsdam) was a German history painter. Later as professor he taught art at the Unterrichtsanstalt des Kunstgewerbemuseums Berlin; head of the academic master's studio for monumental painting, theatrical and decorative painting.

Koch not only painted, but explored photography in the late 1800s and published two art nude model study works in collotype, posed and published according to artistic and academia criteria, titled Freilicht (Heft I) and in collaboration with the architect and sculptor  (1858–1911) Der Akt (Heft II). The art nudes by Koch became known to every artist and art student of that time period, who as a history painter had also achieved a name in wider art circles.

Biography 
Koch came from a family of artists where he received his first learning in painting. His father, and older brother Georg, were both painters. The three of them often worked together on large commissions and occasionally collaborated with the maritime artist Hans Bohrdt. His younger brother, Friedrich, was a composer and music teacher.

Koch would later be described as a Schaller-student in everything, but would moreover surpass his master; Koch was much more generous, gripping and powerful in his monumental painting, and even more sensitive and intimate in his small-scale painting. From 1876 to 1877, Koch undertook a study trip to Italy, with the help of a scholarship, and completed his studies upon returning to Berlin. Beginning in 1879, Koch worked with Friedrich von Thiersch, decorating the Alte Oper concert hall in Frankfurt am Main. The year 1881 found him in Paris, at the École Nationale Supérieure des Beaux-Arts, working with Pierre-Victor Galland.

In 1883, Koch returned to Berlin and became successor at the decorative arts museum teaching institute in Berlin to professor Moritz Meurer, who had retired himself at age 44 to live permanently in Rome. Koch would hold this position until 1924 when his successor and former student  was selected to replace Koch, an equal honor for both master and student, and who would continue Koch's legacy and the works of the "Ernst Johannes Schaller-period". During his time, Koch became eminent for his work on several panoramas. This was replaced in 1888, with a panorama by Koch and his brother Georg, that depicted the Great Fire of Rome. In 1891 this was, in turn, replaced by a collaboration between all three Kochs and Bohrdt, showing Kaiser Wilhelm II, on his way to visit the Bosporus Germans.

Koch also decorated numerous public and private buildings with monumental historical scenes, which were very popular during the Imperial Prussia period. This included areas in the Prussian House of Lords, the Prussian House of Representatives, and the Berlin-Brandenburg Academy of Sciences and Humanities, as well as in the Wertheim and Tietz department stores.

The journal was elaborately designed in German Jugendstil (Art Nouveau), produced on art paper and was one the first to include "culturally nude" life photographs by various past and present photographers. The Reich Court of Justice in Leipzig subsequently acquitted the journalist and publisher  in two test cases in 1906 and 1909 with "the representation of naked people for the purpose of publicity for Freikörperkultur (free body culture) is declared for not punishable".

Publications

Photography
Photography works and model studies in open air nature and studio, according to artistic and academia criteria
"Freilicht" (Book I), by Professor Max Koch, published by Internationaler Kunstverlag M. Bauer & Co., Leipzig, ca. 1890s
"Der Akt" (Book II) and in French publication "L'Act (La Modèle humaine)", by Professor Max Koch & Architect and Sculptor Otto Rieth, published by Internationaler Kunstverlag M. Bauer & Co., Leipzig, 1894

Selected works

References

Bibliography 
 "Koch, Max Friedrich". In: Hans Vollmer (Ed.): Allgemeines Lexikon der Bildenden Künstler von der Antike bis zur Gegenwart, Vol.21: Knip–Krüger. E. A. Seemann, Leipzig 1927, pps. 90–91.
 "Max Koch". In: Hans Vollmer (Ed.): Allgemeines Lexikon der bildenden Künstler des XX. Jahrhunderts. Vol.3: K–P. E. A. Seemann, Leipzig 1956, pg.75.
 Biography, paintings and criticism @ the Max Friedrich Koch Blogspot (in German)

External links 

 More works by Koch @ ArtNet
 Photography works and model study by Koch The J. Paul Getty Museum: part collection extracted from publications "Freilicht" (Book I) by Professor Max Koch and "Der Akt" (Book II) by Professor Max Koch & Architect and Sculptor Otto Rieth, published by Internationaler Kunstverlag M. Bauer & Co., Leipzig, 1890s
 

1859 births
1930 deaths
19th-century German painters
19th-century German male artists
German landscape painters
German history painters
Decorative arts
Artists from Berlin
German photographers
20th-century German painters
20th-century German male artists